Maria Sharapova was the two-time defending champion, but withdrew in the quarterfinals due to illness.

Serena Williams won her second Internazionali BNL d'Italia title, defeating Victoria Azarenka in the final, 6–1, 6–3. Williams won without dropping a set, without dropping more than three games per set, and without dropping more than four games per match.

Seeds
The top eight seeds receive a bye into the second round.

Draw

Finals

Top half

Section 1

Section 2

Bottom half

Section 3

Section 4

Qualifying

Seeds

Qualifiers

Lucky losers
  Lourdes Domínguez Lino

Draw

First qualifier

Second qualifier

Third qualifier

Fourth qualifier

Fifth qualifier

Sixth qualifier

Seventh qualifier

Eighth qualifier

References
Main draw
Qualifying draw

Italian Open - Singles
Women's Singles